Frank Silcock may refer to:
 Frank Silcock (footballer)
 Frank Silcock (cricketer)